Landmark School in Beverly, Massachusetts is an American school for students in grades 2–12 with language-based learning disabilities such as dyslexia and executive function disorder.

History
Landmark School was founded in 1971 by Dr. Charles Drake with the goal of educating students whose reading, writing, spelling, and mathematical skills did not align with their thinking and problem-solving abilities. In the beginning, there were only 40 students and a small group of teachers on one campus in Beverly, Massachusetts. Today, Landmark serves over 475 students in grades 2-12 from 23 states and 10 countries. The current Headmaster is Robert Broudo.  Landmark offers both a day program, boarding program, and summer program.

Landmark Today
99% of Landmark School graduates are accepted to college and 90% attend. The cornerstone of the Landmark approach is the one-to-one daily tutorial for every student. Landmark's 3-to-1 teacher to student ratio makes this possible. The school has expanded their facilities significantly since the early days and has 33 buildings on 35 acres on two coastal campuses located in Prides Crossing and Manchester-by-the-Sea, Massachusetts. Visual and performing arts, athletics, residential life, and community service round out a challenging, customized college-preparatory curriculum.

A Mission With a School
So that the school can reach many more than the 475 students that can attend Landmark, the school established the Landmark Outreach Program which offers a comprehensive professional development program for educators based on applied research related to language-based learning disabilities. These include Landmark's "Six Teaching Principles" and more than 48 years of innovative instruction of students at Landmark School.

The Landmark Outreach Program offers online courses for educators, a Summer Institute, school consultations, and online resources. More than 5,000 educators benefit from Landmark Outreach's professional development programs each year to serve students in public and private schools struggling with dyslexia and other language-based learning disabilities. 

Landmark School hosts the Landmark360 blog sharing articles by expert authors related to the art and science of learning.

References

External links
Landmark School Website
Landmark Outreach Website
Landmark360 blog Website

Boarding schools in Massachusetts
Schools in Beverly, Massachusetts